This was the first edition of the event.

Nicole Melichar and Xu Yifan won the title, defeating Gabriela Dabrowski and Darija Jurak in the final, 2–6, 7–5, [10–5].

Seeds

Draw

Draw

References

External Links
 Main Draw in WTA website (archived)
 Main Draw

Adelaide International - Doubles
2020 Women's Doubles
Adel
January 2020 sports events in Australia